Cheddar Cheese I Say is the sixth full-length studio solo album released by Keak Da Sneak on August 28, 2012. it features guest appearances from Big Hollis among others.

Track listing
Disc 1
 "There They Go" (featuring Big Hollis & Goldie Gold)- 3:22
 "Chance Taka" (featuring Complex & Krytykal) - 3:29
 "Tatta Puttie" - 2:21
 "Let 'Em Cut Their Own Throat " - 3:00
 "Show Off" (featuring Complex) - 3:02
 "So Serious" (featuring Tieck Tock) - 3:56
 "Call Me Keak Da Sneak" (featuring D-Buck) - 2:51
 "You Did Something" - 1:35
 "The Names" - 2:28
 "Against the Wall" - 3:44
 "Making All Rights" - 3:57
 "All P's" (featuring Sycosis) - 4:15
 "Bussing" - 2:59
 "Go" (featuring Sycosis) - 4:28
 "The Sneak Come Out" - 3:12
 "The Female Funk" - 2:11
 "Get Hyphy" - 2:39

References 

Keak da Sneak albums
2012 albums